T. Richard Blurton (born 1952) is a specialist in South Asian art and archaeology, formerly Assistant Keeper at the British Museum.

About
Blurton has an MPhil in archaeology from Cambridge, and worked on excavations and research projects in Afghanistan and southern India, before joining the British Museum in 1986. A curator in the Dept of Oriental Antiquities (subsequently, the Dept of Asia), he was responsible for the collections from south India, Southeast Asia, and Tibet. He retired in 2018.

Awards and honours
2012 Awarded the Brayton Wilbur Jr. Memorial Fellowship in Asian Art

Selected publications
 1990 – Continuity and change in the tradition of Bengali pata-painting
 1991 – The Cultural Heritage of the Indian Village (with Brian Durrans)
 1992 – Hindu Art
 1997 – The Enduring Image: Treasures from the British Museum (ed.)
 2000 – Visions from the Golden Land: Burma and the Art of Lacquer (co-authored with Ralph Isaacs)
 2002 – Burma: Art and Archaeology (co-edited with Alexandra Green)
 2003 – "On the Borders of Tibet", British Museum Magazine, no. 45 (summer 2003)
 2006 – Bengali Myths (Czech edn, 2007; Spanish edn, 2008)
 2016 – Krishna in the garden of Assam the history and context of a much-travelled textile

External links
 T. Richard Blurton on "Curating Krishna in the garden of Assam" on YouTube
 T. Richard Blurton on WorldCat

References

1952 births
Living people
Alumni of the University of Cambridge
British archaeologists
Employees of the British Museum
Historians of Indian art